John Brown is a biography written by W. E. B. Du Bois about the abolitionist John Brown. Published in 1909, it tells the story of John Brown, from his Christian rural upbringing, to his failed business ventures and finally his "blood feud" with the institution of slavery as a whole. Its moral symbolizes the significance and impact of a white abolitionist at the time, a sign of threat for white slave owners and those who believed that only black people were behind the idea of freeing slaves.

Du Bois highlights the moment in Brown's childhood when he first became radicalized against slavery:

It was this moment that Brown pledged to destroy slavery. Du Bois describes Brown as a biblical character: fanatically devoted to his abolitionist cause but also a man of rigid social and moral rules. Du Bois simultaneously describes Brown as a revolutionary, prophet and martyr, and declares him to be "a man whose leadership lay not in his office, wealth or influence, but in the white flame of his utter devotion to an ideal" (p. 135).

Du Bois also showcases his studies on socialism and social Darwinism in this work. He continuation the examination of the genealogy of Blacks outlined in The Philadelphia Negro (1899) and The Souls of Black Folk (1903), that refutes the biological differences between Blacks and whites.

According to Du Bois, Brown was a man who based his fight against slavery not on social Darwinism, but on his personal values.

In 1997 a new edition appeared, with a new introduction and primary documents.

References

External links

 
 
 

1909 non-fiction books
American biographies
John Brown (abolitionist)
Non-fiction books about American slavery
Works by W. E. B. Du Bois